Gary D. Turner (born 1945) is an American retired professional basketball player. He played for the Houston Mavericks in two games during the 1967–68 American Basketball Association season. He recorded totals of six points and three rebounds.

References

1945 births
Living people
American men's basketball players
Basketball players from Texas
Boston Celtics draft picks
Forwards (basketball)
Houston Mavericks players
Sportspeople from Fort Worth, Texas
TCU Horned Frogs men's basketball players